Serigne Modou Kara Mbodji (born 22 November 1989), commonly known as Kara or Kara Mbodji, is a Senegalese professional footballer who plays for Al-Sailiya and the Senegal national team. He can be deployed as a defender, defensive midfielder or in the central midfield.

Club career
At the age of 15, Mbodji joined the Diambars academy in Dakar, Senegal. On 2 February 2010, he joined Norwegian club Tromsø IL. During his three seasons in the Norwegian Premier League, he was awarded best player of his team and twice second best player of the Championship.

On 31 December 2012, Mbodji joined KRC Genk for a fee of €1.4 million. After regularly starting for Genk in defence and winning the 2012–13 Belgian Cup, his contract was extended until June 2018.

On 7 August 2015, he joined R.S.C. Anderlecht for a fee of €4.5 million, signing a four-year deal until June 2019. In August 2017, he agreed a contract extension with the club until 2020. In his time at the club he made 97 appearances scoring 7 goals.

On 30 August 2018, one day before the closing of the 2018 summer transfer window, Mbodji moved to Ligue 1 side FC Nantes on loan for the 2018–19 season. Nantes also secured an option to sign him permanently. His loan ended early, in January 2019, with Mbodji citing lack of playing time.

On 20 July 2019, Al-Sailiya signed Kara Mbodji for three season from Anderlecht.

International career
Mbodji was a part of the Senegal team for the 2012 Olympic Games. He was included in the Senegal national football team's squad for the 2015 Africa Cup of Nations and scored in a 1–1 draw with South Africa in the team's second group match.

In June 2018 he was named in Senegal's 23-man squad for the 2018 World Cup in Russia.

Career statistics

Club

International

International goals
Scores and results list Senegal's goal tally first.

Honours

Club
Genk
Belgian Cup: 2012–13

Anderlecht
Belgian First Division A: 2016–17
Belgian Super Cup: 2017

Al-Sailiya SC
Qatari Stars Cup: 2021-22

References

External links
Kara Mbodji at Tromsø IL official website

1989 births
Living people
Association football defenders
Association football midfielders
Senegalese footballers
Senegal international footballers
People from Thiès Region
Senegal Premier League players
Eliteserien players
Belgian Pro League players
Ligue 1 players
Qatar Stars League players
Diambars FC players
Tromsø IL players
K.R.C. Genk players
R.S.C. Anderlecht players
FC Nantes players
Al-Sailiya SC players
Senegalese expatriate footballers
Expatriate footballers in Norway
Expatriate footballers in Belgium
Expatriate footballers in France
Expatriate footballers in Qatar
Senegalese expatriate sportspeople in Norway
Senegalese expatriate sportspeople in Belgium
Senegalese expatriate sportspeople in France
Senegalese expatriate sportspeople in Qatar
2011 CAF U-23 Championship players
Olympic footballers of Senegal
Footballers at the 2012 Summer Olympics
2015 Africa Cup of Nations players
2017 Africa Cup of Nations players
2018 FIFA World Cup players